Bekenstein is a surname. Notable people with the surname include:

 Jacob Bekenstein (1947–2015), Mexican-born Israeli-American physicist
 Joshua Bekenstein, American businessman